The Cambridge History of British Theatre is a non-fiction work consisting of three volumes in book form. It was originally published in 2004 by Cambridge University Press. It was later published online in 2008, also by Cambridge University Press. It is not an encyclopedia. Essay articles are in rough chronological order and have been compiled in the three volumes by various editors.

About the books
Volume 1 covers the British theater from its Roman colony origins to 1660, when Charles II was about to be restored to the throne. Volume 2 covers a little over two centuries, beginning with Charles II's restoration in 1660, until the beginning of the twentieth century, approximately 1895. Volume three covers the British theater from 1895.

See also

 London theatre closure 1642
 King's Men § Aftermath for the history of one company affected by the prohibition
 William Robbins an actor who lost his living, and fought and died for the Royalist cause.
 Antitheatricality 16th and 17th century
 English Renaissance theatre
 Theatre of Scotland
 Returning to Shakespeare

References

External links

The Cambridge History of British Theatre, Volume 3. Google Books. Retrieved December 27, 2019. Free Preview available. 

Cultural history of the United Kingdom
Theatre in the United Kingdom
Theatre in Scotland
Theatre in Ireland
17th century in London
18th century in London
19th century in London
20th century in London
Textual criticism